Scott Wilson (August 6, 1950 – May 6, 2018) was an American bodybuilder who won Mr. America and Mr. International titles in the 1970s and 1980s. In the 1990s and in 2000, he competed in the IFBB Masters Mr. Olympia contest.

Early years
Wilson was born in San Diego, California, to Mitchell and Gwen Wilson. He grew up in Lakeside, California, where he began weight training as a child and wrestled and played football in high school. After graduating, he enlisted in the United States Marine Corps. In 1973, he entered the Mr. San Diego contest on a dare and won the competition. The following year, in 1974, he won the AAU Mr. California contest. This set Wilson on a path towards a career in professional bodybuilding.

Career

After winning Mr. California in 1974, Wilson turned pro. He won the WBBG Pro Mr. America contest in 1976, the IFBB Mr. International contest in 1981, and the IFBB Portland Grand Prix in 1983. In the later years of his career, he competed in the IFBB Masters Mr. Olympia contest three times. His last competition was in 2000, and he formally retired in 2001.

Wilson also competed as a powerlifter for a time, bench pressing , squatting  and deadlifting .

List of competitions

Later years and death
Wilson resided in California with his wife, Vy, and his children, Scott, Michael and Erik. He died on May 6, 2018, in Merced, California, after a lengthy battle with skin cancer that had metastasized.

References

External links
 Gallery of Scott Wilson photos

1950 births
2018 deaths
American bodybuilders
Professional bodybuilders
Sportspeople from San Diego
United States Marines
People from Lakeside, California